Djan-Aka Djan (born 1942) is a retired Afghanistan wrestler who was national champion and competed at the 1964 Summer Olympic Games,  the 1968 Summer Olympics, the 1972 Summer Olympic Games in the lightweight events, and weighs 150 pounds.

References

External links
 

Wrestlers at the 1964 Summer Olympics
Wrestlers at the 1972 Summer Olympics
Afghan male sport wrestlers
Olympic wrestlers of Afghanistan
Wrestlers at the 1974 Asian Games
1942 births
Living people
Asian Games competitors for Afghanistan